Marguerittes is a commune in the Gard department in southern France. In 1717, Antoine de Teissier (b.1667) was created the 1st Baron de Marguerittes. One of his sons was a Huguenot who took refuge in Switzerland and his grandson, Jean Antoine de Teissier, 3rd Baron of Marguerittes, was guillotined 20 May 1794. The 3rd Baron's son settled in England at Woodcote Park and was created Baron de Teissier by Louis XVIII in recognition of his father's sacrifices to France.

Population

See also
Communes of the Gard department

References

Communes of Gard